Jean-Charles Taugourdeau (born July 17, 1953 in Dreux) was a member of the National Assembly of France. He represented Maine-et-Loire's 3rd constituency from 2002 to 2020,  as a member of the Republicans. He was succeeded as MP by Anne-Laure Blin.

References

1953 births
Living people
People from Dreux
Politicians from Centre-Val de Loire
Mayors of places in Pays de la Loire
Rally for the Republic politicians
Union for a Popular Movement politicians
The Republicans (France) politicians
The Strong Right
Deputies of the 12th National Assembly of the French Fifth Republic
Deputies of the 13th National Assembly of the French Fifth Republic
Deputies of the 14th National Assembly of the French Fifth Republic
Deputies of the 15th National Assembly of the French Fifth Republic